The Men's individual pursuit competition at the 2019 UCI Track Cycling World Championships was held on 1 March 2019.

Results

Qualifying
The qualifying was started at 15:43. The first two racers raced for gold, the third and fourth fastest rider raced for the bronze medal.

Finals
The final was started at 20:32.

References

Men's individual pursuit
2019